Naïve is the fifth studio album by German industrial band KMFDM, released on November 15, 1990 by Wax Trax! Records. It was recorded following KMFDM's return from their first visit to the United States and subsequent tour with Ministry. It was also the first record they released after signing directly to Wax Trax! Records.

Background
The album was out of print for over a decade due to copyright infringement: the seventh track "Liebeslied" used unauthorized samples from a recording of "O Fortuna", from Carl Orff's 1930s cantata Carmina Burana. The album was recalled approximately three years after being released. Copies today are rare and considered collector's items. In addition to this, "Godlike" samples "Angel of Death" by Slayer.

All of the tracks on the album, except for the original mixes of "Die Now-Live Later", "Liebeslied" and "Go to Hell" were subsequently available on other discs. The album was re-released as Naïve/Hell to Go, with some songs remixed, in 1994. A digitally remastered reissue of Naïve was released on 21 November 2006, along with Money and Angst. It was reissued with an edited version of the track "Liebeslied" without the offending sample. It also features the remixes that initially appeared on Naïve/Hell to Go.

Critical reception

Naïve received excellent reviews. Stephen Thomas Erlewine called Naïve "one of [KMFDM's] strongest releases." Ned Raggett of Allmusic began his review by saying, "KMFDM brought it all together on the brilliant Naïve", doing "everything from four-to-the-floor beats to Wagnerian epic metal and back again". He went on to call it "one of industrial/electronic body music's key albums", and said that KMFDM was a band "so ridiculously good that everything they touch pretty much turns to gold". He also said that while the title track was "fantastic", the "total standout" of the album was "Liebeslied":

Track listing

Personnel
Sascha Konietzko – vocals, bass, synths, programming, guitars
En Esch – vocals, drums, guitars
Günter Schulz – guitars
Rudolph Naomi – drums (1–4, 6–10)

Additional personnel
Christine Siewert – background vocals
Johann Bley – drums (5)
William Tucker – guitar (11)
Bill Rieflin – drums (11)
Mark Durante – guitar (11–16)

Production
Brute - cover art
Blank Fontana - engineering (1-11)
Chris Shepard - engineering (12-16)
Paul Barker – production (11)
Lee Popa - production (11)

Naïve/Hell to Go

Naïve/Hell to Go is a modified and remixed version of Naïve, with five of the original songs re-recorded, including "Liebeslied", which contained an unlicensed sample of "O Fortuna" from Carl Orff's cantata Carmina Burana. After Orff's publisher threatened the band with legal action, the original album was recalled.

Track listing

References

External links
 KMFDM DØTKØM Naïve lyrics at the official KMFDM website
 KMFDM DØTKØM Naïve/Hell to Go lyrics at the official KMFDM website

1990 albums
KMFDM albums
1994 albums
Metropolis Records albums
Wax Trax! Records albums